Promotion of Putonghua (also 推普) is a movement led by the government of China since the Communist Party came to the power. Currently, the Promotion of Putonghua is led by State Language Work Committee (国家语言文字工作委员会), a governing body which regulates language use on behalf of the People's Republic of China.

See also
Standard Chinese
Varieties of Chinese
Linguistic imperialism
Protection of the varieties of Chinese
Speak Mandarin Campaign in Singapore

References

Standard Chinese
Languages of China
Language policy in China
Politics of China
Education in China
Human rights in China
Sociolinguistics